The Kromfohrländer commonly known as Kromi is a breed of dog that originated in Germany. It is used as a companion dog. Particularly long lived, reaching 17-18 years old regularly. Very attached to their owners, often being described as a "one-person dog".

Appearance

The Kromfohrlander comes in 2 coat variations: rough hair (Rauhaar) and smooth hair (Glatthaar). The distinction is the presence of a beard on the rough variety and a rather long coat on the furnishings of the smooth variety. Therefore, the rough resembles a terrier, while the smooth looks rather like a spaniel.

Size
This dog is medium in size
Height:  at the withers.
Weight: .

Coloration 
Two recognized coloration patterns exist, white & brown and white & tan.

Temperament
The Kromfohrlander is a very lively, sensitive, athletic, good-natured, intelligent breed. They love to play and run, are very active and have comparatively little hunting instinct.

Kromfohrlanders are considered very friendly dogs and they rarely stray very far from their owner. They can adapt to many situations fairly well with proper socializing. They take to strangers and children rather hesitantly at first, but once they become familiar, remain friends for life.

Health
Breed health problems include epilepsy, cystinuria (buildup of amino acids in the urine), hyperkeratosis ('corny feet' known in some terrier breeds) and patellar luxation (knee dislocation). Breeding dogs are tested for hyperkeratosis through an inexpensive DNA test.

It is a breed with very limited genetics and is very difficult to acquire. Currently, a genetics expansion project, supervised and sanctioned by FCI, is being conducted in Finland and Germany. Large panel DNA tests are being used by some breeders.

History

Origin
The Kromfohrlander originated in Germany in the 1940s. It is the only dog breed descended from a military mascot dog. 'Original Peter' was found in France by American soldiers during World War II. Peter came to Germany with his troop and was lost. He was discovered by Ilsa Schleifenbaum, who developed the breed using various dogs (most likely terrier and griffon type breeds) for 10 years.

The Kromfohrlander remains an exceptionally rare breed, even in its country of origin. As of 2018, there are / have been 54 recorded AKC FSS Kromfohrlanders and 7 undocumented Kromfohrlanders in North America.

Spread outside of Germany
The Kromfohrlander was first recognized by FCI for showing in 1955. The Kromfohrlander came to Scandinavia starting in the early 1970s. The first smooth Kromfohrlander came to North America from Germany in 1997 when he was 2 years old. He sired the first smooth Kromfohrlander litter born in the US in 2000. He sired a second smooth Kromfohrlander litter in 2004. Each litter produced 2 puppies, all of which were kept by the breeders and none of whom reproduced. The first rough Kromfohrlander came to North America (USA) from Luxembourg in 1993, but was never bred. No other Kromfohrlanders brought to North America between 2004–2016 were ever bred, and no Kromfohrlander of either coat type has ever otherwise been bred to any other dog of any breed in North America.
 
The Kromfohrlander was admitted to American Kennel Club (AKC) Foundation Stock Service (FSS) in 2012.

The rough Kromfohrlander was first exhibited in the US in 2013 at a United Kennel Club dog show in Ann Arbor, Michigan. The rough Kromfohrlander was first exhibited at an American Kennel Club Open Show in 2014 in Orlando, Florida. The first breeding of rough Kromfohrlanders in North America was in the US in 2016. There were 9 puppies. The first rough Kromfohrlander was exhibited in Mexico in 2017.

See also
 Dogs portal
 List of dog breeds

References

External links

 Kromfohrländer Club of America
 Association for Wirehaired Kromfohrländers/Germany
 Finnish Breed Association for Kromfohrländer
 Swedish Kromfohrlander Club
 Rassezuchtverein der Kromfohrländer/German Kromfohrländer Club

Companion dogs
Dog breeds originating in Germany
FCI breeds
Rare dog breeds